Troy Little (born 7 March 1973) is a Canadian cartoonist working in comic books and animation. He is known for Chiaroscuro, a graphic novel whose first volume (out of three) was developed between 2000 and 2005 under his Meanwhile, Studios imprint. After winning two grants (Xeric and P.E.I. Council of the Arts) and being praised by Dave Sim, Chiaroscuro vol. 1 was released in 2007 by IDW Publishing.

Biography
Troy Little was born on 7 March 1973 in Prince Edward Island, Canada. In 1994, he graduated from the Interpretive Illustration program of Sheridan College, and has since worked as an animator. After living eight years in Ottawa, he moved back to Kensington, Prince Edward Island, Canada. He is the father of Nathan and twins Alex and Hayden. In parallel to his daytime job in animation, he writes and draws his own graphic novels.

In September 2000, he started work on his self-published black & white comic series Chiaroscuro with which he was awarded in 2001 a Xeric Grant. The comic was published bi-monthly and ran for seven issues ending prematurely in 2003 (both Little and his then wife having lost their jobs and having twins to raise). Little eventually continued to draw the missing issues #8-10 to conclude the first volume. In 2005, he was awarded a P.E.I. Council of the Arts Grants to enable him to continue work on the series. In late 2005, he had completed his first storyline as the graphic novel Chiaroscuro: Patchwork Book 1 (collecting issues #1-10), and started sending out a 100-copy POD run to publishers.

In 2007, this first volume of Chiaroscuro received an excellent review by independent comics legend Dave Sim (creator of Cerebus) written on his Blog & Mail. This review brought the book to the attention of Ted Adams, President of IDW Publishing in San Diego. IDW published a hardcover edition of the graphic novel in October 2007, and its trade paperback edition in October 2008.

In January 2009, Troy Little released Angora Napkin, a standalone graphic novel from IDW Publishing which was nominated for an Eisner Award. Angora Napkin was developed into an animated pilot for Teletoon's late night program "Teletoon at Night" for a series which was broadcast on Halloween night, 2010. But the pilot was never picked up. He later created a second Angora Napkin graphic novel, Harvest of Revenge, which was again nominated for an Eisner. He ventured into webcomics with the online serial Angora Napkin: The Golden McGuffin that ran sporadically from 2011-2019.

From 2013-2014 he wrote and drew the comic book series The Powerpuff Girls, published by IDW and based on the Cartoon Network animated series.

2015 brought the news that Little had created the authorized graphic novel adaptation of Hunter S. Thompson's book Fear and Loathing in Las Vegas, published in late October / early November by Top Shelf Productions.

During the Fear and Loathing in Las Vegas book tour Little met Kevin Eastman, co-creator of the Teenage Mutant Ninja Turtles. In 2017 Eastman tapped Little to help develop his Drawing Blood / Radically Rearranged Ronin Ragdolls series which was successfully Kickstarted in published in 2018. This was followed by a second volume of Ragdolls that he illustrated and co-wrote with Drawing Blood writer David Avallone.   

In 2018, Little teamed up with writers Jim Zub and Patrick Rothfuss for the limited series Rick and Morty vs. Dungeons & Dragons #1-4, published by IDW. This book was followed up in 2020 (without Rothfuss) with Volume 2: Painscape, published by Oni Press. The Rick and Morty vs Dungeons and Dragons Deluxe Edition, by Rothfuss, Zub, and Little, was nominated for the 2022 "Best Graphic Album—Reprint" Eisner Award.

Also in 2019, Troy and his wife Brenda Hickey ("My Little Pony", "Aggretsuko") formed their own imprint: Pegamoose Press. Their first book, Hickey's "Halls of the Turnip King" was successfully Kickstarted and published in early 2020. The second book from Pegamoose Press will be, "Angora Napkin: The Golden McGuffin" which is slated to be published in the early fall of 2020.

Works

 2001-2003: Chiaroscuro #1-7 (Meanwhile, Studios)
 2004-2005: Chiaroscuro #8-10 (drawn but not published)
 2005: Chiaroscuro: Patchwork Book 1 (100-copy POD demo, late 2005, collecting #1-10)
 2007: Chiaroscuro HC (IDW Publishing, October 2007 hardcover collecting #1-10)
 2008: Chiaroscuro TP (IDW Publishing, October 2008 softcover collecting #1-10)

 2009: Angora Napkin (IDW Publishing, graphic novel)
 2012: Angora Napkin: Harvest of Revenge (IDW Publishing, graphic novel)
 2013: The Powerpuff Girls (IDW Publishing, comic series)
 2015: Hunter S. Thompson's Fear and Loathing in Las Vegas (Top Shelf Productions)
 2016: "Angora Napkin: Cuddle Core Collection" (IDW Publishing, graphic novel collection)
 2018: "Radically Rearranged Ronin Ragdolls" (Kevin Eastman Studios, comic book)
 2019: "Rick & Morty VS Dungeons & Dragons" (IDW Publishing, comic series)
 2020: "Rick & Morty VS Dungeons & Dragons: Painscape" (Oni Press, comic series)
 2020: "Radically Rearranged Ronin Ragdolls Adventures" (Kevin Eastman Studios, comic book)
 2020: "Angora Napkin: The Golden McGuffin" (Pegamoose Press, graphic novel)

Sources

References

External links
 Pegamoose Press – Pegamoose Press official website

Text interviews
 A 2009 interview of Troy Little at Comic Book Resources (about Angora Napkin, Chiaroscuro, and his career)

Video interviews
  from CBC (Flash link)
  from Eastlink TV (Flash link)
 "Chiaroscuro from IDW with Troy Little", Oct. 2007 interview podcast from ComiXology (AAC link)

1973 births
Living people
Canadian cartoonists
Canadian comics artists
Canadian comics writers
Canadian graphic novelists
Sheridan College alumni
Writers from Prince Edward Island
People from Prince County, Prince Edward Island